Miguel Jiménez may refer to:

 Miguel Jiménez (boxer) (born 1970), boxer from Puerto Rico
 Miguel Ángel Jiménez (born 1964), Spanish golfer
 Miguel Jiménez (footballer) (born 1980), Chilean footballer
 Miguel Jiménez Ponce (born 1990),Mexican footballer
 Miguel Jimenez (baseball) (born 1969), Major League Baseball pitcher